The men's freestyle 79 kg is a competition featured at the Golden Grand Prix Ivan Yarygin 2018, and was held in Krasnoyarsk, Russia on the 27th of January.

Medalists

Results
Legend
F — Won by fall

Final

Top half

qualification: Tzhudin Akaev of Dagestan vs. Radik Valiev of RNO-Alania def. (3-4)

Repechage

References
 

Men's freestyle 79 kg